Atlantic Diving Supply is an American contractor. They are one of the 100 largest federal contractors.

Overview
Atlantic Diving Supply is a reseller of military equipment based in Virginia Beach, Virginia. In 2019, they were the 24th largest federal contractor.

According to the Virginian-Pilot "ADS packages related items into "kits" - cold-weather gear for soldiers or flame-retardant gear for firefighters, for example - to be shipped together."

History
Atlantic Diving Supply started as a small dive shop in Virginia Beach, Virginia named Lynnhaven Dive Center, which was opened in 1979 by Mike Hillier Sr. Due to its location many early customers had ties to the military. In 1997, the son of the company's founder Luke Hillier created an offshoot which would handle federal contracting with a focus on the military diving community. In 2000, they won their first major contract from the Defense Logistics Agency. Its growth was fueled by the post-9/11 military spending boom.

In 2010 ADS had $1.3 billion in sales with 4,000 customers (primarily from the Department of Defense and Department of Homeland Security) and 1,400 vendors. In 2010 they considered going public through an initial public offering (IPO) and filed paperwork to that effect with the Securities and Exchange Commission. They did not go through with the IPO.

In 2011, ADS sued non-profit Bancroft Global Development for breach of contract over an order for 18,000 military boots and other equipment. Bancroft countersued them for providing sub-standard equipment, especially cheap costume quality military boots from China, allegations which were substantiated by reporting. The equipment was intended for the transitional federal government of Somalia and was part of a US State Department contract which was awarded to DynCorp International and then subcontracted out.

By 2012, ADS was doing $1 billion a year in government contracting and paid $9m in executive compensation. Company head Jason Wallace received $2.2 million.

In 2015, ADS bought Theodore Wille International, an international military logistics company. In that same year they won a five-year $72 million contract to deliver 1,249 Mk 153 Shoulder-Launched Multipurpose Assault Weapon (SMAW) systems to the US Marine Corps. These SMAW have a number of improvements from the original model including the replacement of the 9mm spotting gun with laser and thermal sights.

By 2017, ADS had more than $2 billion in revenue.

In 2017, ADS agreed to pay $16 million to settle a case which centered on allegations that it had used smaller entities it controlled to fraudulently bid on federal contracts as small businesses. In 2019 Ron Villanueva was convicted for helping SEK Solutions, one of the small ADS controlled entities, improperly get contracts set aside for women and minority-owned small businesses.

In 2019, ADS was awarded a $49 million contract to supply the base model holsters for the Army's new M17 and M18 service pistols. The holster is made by Safariland.

ADS was one of two companies selected to supply the exercise equipment to the US Army needed to implement the Army Combat Fitness Test (ACFT).

They were a significant vendor of personal protective equipment and other supplies to the federal government during the COVID-19 pandemic. They came under scrutiny during this period, due to receiving millions of dollars in pandemic related loans earmarked for small businesses.

In July 2020, former CEO Luke Hillier paid $20 million to settle a personal fraud case against him stemming from his tenure as CEO at ADS.

In March 2021 ADS was awarded a $100 million Defense Logistics Agency contract to supply patient monitoring technology along with training and support.

See also
 Military engineering
 War on terror
 Chemonics
 Vectrus
 Engility

References

Defense companies of the United States